Hunter Valley zone may refer to:
 Hunter Region, a geographical region of New South Wales, Australia
 A  wine-producing region in the Hunter Region